John Holcomb may refer to:
 John Noble Holcomb, United States Army soldier and Medal of Honor recipient
 John W. Holcomb, American judge